St Nicholas Church in Newchurch, Lancashire, England, is an active Anglican parish church in the diocese of Manchester, founded in the early 16th century.

History
The first church was thought to be made of wood and erected in 1511, and it was rebuilt in stone in 1561 in the reign of Queen Elizabeth I.

This was replaced by the current building, dated 1825 over the west door, which is believed to have been constructed by the parishioners themselves without the benefit of an architect. The chancel was added in 1897 by R.B Preston. It is a Grade II* listed building.

Today the parish is styled: St Nicholas, Newchurch with St John and St Michael. St. Michael's was built in Lumb in 1848 and St. John's was built at Cloughfold in 1890.

References

External links

 St Nicholas Church

Church of England church buildings in Lancashire
16th-century Church of England church buildings
Buildings and structures in the Borough of Rossendale
Grade II* listed churches in Lancashire